Budweiser is an American-style pale lager produced by Anheuser-Busch.

Budweiser may also refer to:

 Budweiser, a person or product from České Budějovice, Czech Republic
 Budweiser Bier Bürgerbräu, a brewery founded in 1795 in České Budějovice  
 Budweiser Budvar Brewery, a brewery founded in 1895 in České Budějovice
 Budweiser Budvar, a pale lager produced by Budweiser Budvar Brewery
 A nickname for the U.S. Navy Special Warfare insignia 
 "Budweiser", a song by Fear from American Beer, 2000
 "Budweiser", a song by Nate Haller from Party in the Back, 2022

See also
 Budweiser 500 (disambiguation)